Center Township is one of eleven townships in Howard County, Indiana, United States. As of the 2010 census, its population was 45,275 and it contained 22,736 housing units.

History
Center Township was named from its position at the geographical center of Howard County.

Townships have been an integral part of Indiana government since the 1857 constitution. Each township elects an executive officer-the trustee, and three legislative officers- members of the township board. Each serve four year terms. Currently, as of 2023, the trustee is Andrew Durham, and the board members are Tom Cleaver Jr, Linda Koontz, and Debra Rahe. .

Geography

Cities and towns
 Kokomo (vast majority)

Unincorporated towns
 Darrough Chapel
 Shambaugh Siding
(This list is based on USGS data and may include former settlements.)

Adjacent townships
 Howard Township (northeast)
 Taylor Township (southeast)
 Harrison Township (southwest)
 Clay Township (northwest)

Major highways

Demographics

2010 Census

Cemeteries
The township contains two operational cemeteries: Crown Point and Memorial Park. The township also maintains Puckett Cemetery at the corner of Malfalfa Rd & Sycamore St and a small cemetery at the corner of Berkley Rd and Markland Ave.

Libraries
Kokomo-Howard County Main Branch Library, in Kokomo

Schools
See main article Kokomo-Center Township Consolidated School Corporation
School's outside of the above school district in Center Township include:

Colleges
Indiana University Kokomo
Indiana Wesleyan University Kokomo Campus
Ivy Tech Community College
Purdue College of Technology

Private Schools
There is also 5 private schools in Center Township

References
 
 United States Census Bureau cartographic boundary files

External links
 Indiana Township Association
 Center Township of Howard County, Indiana

Townships in Howard County, Indiana
Kokomo, Indiana metropolitan area
Townships in Indiana